The 2015–16 season is Ittihad Riadi Tanger 33rd in existence and the club's 17th season in the top flight of Moroccan football. The club returned to the first (Botola Pro) division 2015–16 season after an absence of eight years.

Kit
Supplier: Bang Sports / Main Sponsor: front: Moroccan Airports Authority / League Sponsor: front: Maroc Telecom

Players

Squad

 (captain)

*

 (vice-captain)

Out during the season

From youth squad 

*
*

*

Transfers

In (summer)

 irt.ma
 irt.ma
 irt.ma
 irt.ma
 irt.ma
 irt.ma
 kooora.com
 irt.ma
 irt.ma
 irt.ma
 irt.ma
 irt.ma
 irt.ma
 kooora.com
 irt.ma
 irt.ma

Out (summer)

 irt.ma
 kooora.com
 assabah.ma
 kooora.com

In (winter)

 irtfoot.ma 
 le360.ma 
 le360.ma

Out (winter)

 kooora.com 
 kooora.com 
 hnk-sibenik.hr 
 bayanealyaoume
 kooora.com

Technical staff

Goal scorers

Assists

Clean sheets
As of 19 June 2016.

Disciplinary record

Squad statistics
As of 19 June 2016.

|}

Pre-season and friendlies

Competitions

Overview

Botola

League table

Results summary

Results by round

Matches

Results overview

Coupe du Trône

2015

Round of 32

Round of 16

Quarter-finals

2016

Round of 32

References

External links

2015–16 in Moroccan football
Moroccan football club seasons
Ittihad Tanger